Wrestling Association of the Philippines (WAP) is the governing sports organization for wrestling in the Philippines, and maintains the Philippines National Wrestling Team.

National team

The Philippines also competes against teams from Asia. They are promoting grassroots involvement with their national team and have signed Filipino's from around the globe as well as the homeland to compete in tournaments.** This is the current starting squad for the Philippines friendly vs. Malaysia as of December 5, 2009: 

Flags denote Nation of Citizenship.

Age-Groups

The Olympic sport of Greco-Roman and Freestyle wrestling is broken down into three age group levels: Cadets(16-17 yrs.old), Juniors (18-20 yrs.old), and Seniors (20 yrs.old and above). Each group follows different weight categories, as follows:

Reference
 Philippine Olympic Committee

Sports in the Philippines
Sports governing bodies in the Philippines
National members of the Asian Council of Associated Wrestling